The molecular formula C19H24N2O2 may refer to:
 Praziquantel, a medication used to treat types of parasitic worm infections
 Xylamidine, an  amidine drug

Molecular formulas